The Military Exploit Order is the highest military award of Vietnam. It is conferred or posthumously conferred on individuals who have recorded outstanding and brave exploits in combat, combat service, training, force building, consolidation of the all-people defense and people's security, or have sacrificed their lives heroically, setting bright examples in the whole country.

The Military Exploit Order may also be conferred on collectives which satisfy the following criteria:

 Having recorded outstanding achievements for five or more consecutive years before the time of nomination; having maintained internal unity, with clean and strong Party and mass organizations;
 Having a process of combat, combat service, training, building and growth of 30 years or more.

Order consists of three classes:  I - three stars; II - two stars; III - one star.

Gallery

See also 
 Vietnam awards and decorations

References

Orders, decorations, and medals of Vietnam
Military awards and decorations of Vietnam
Awards established in 1947
1947 establishments in Vietnam